Fomes lamaensis is a plant pathogen of the tea plant.

See also 
 List of tea diseases

References

External links 
 USDA ARS Fungal Database

Fungal plant pathogens and diseases
Tea diseases
Polyporaceae